Hugo Gittard is a French animator and director of animated films and shows.

Filmography

Television

References

Xilam
Living people
French film directors
French animated film directors
French television directors
Year of birth missing (living people)

+)